Ashe Warren is a village in the Basingstoke and Deane district of Hampshire, England.

Governance
The village is part of the civil parish of Overton, and is part of the Overton, Laverstoke and Steventon ward of Basingstoke and Deane borough council. The borough council is a non-metropolitan district of Hampshire County Council.

References

Villages in Hampshire